Narvel is a given name. People with the name include:

 Narvel Blackstock, former husband of Reba McEntire
 Narvel J. Crawford (born 1929), former member of the North Carolina House of Representatives.
 Narvel Felts (born 1938), American country music singer

See also
 Navel